The Breast (1972) is a novella by Philip Roth, in which the protagonist, David Kepesh, becomes a 155-pound breast. Throughout the book Kepesh fights with himself. Part of him wishes to give in to bodily desires, while the other part of him wants to be rational. Kepesh, a literature professor, compares his plight with that of fictional characters such as Gregor Samsa in Kafka's short story The Metamorphosis and Kovalyov in Nikolai Gogol's short story "The Nose". Throughout the novel, he describes the various sexual and physical feelings he has while people handle him, while initiating sex with his girlfriend, and while he is alone.

During a stay on the beach with his girlfriend, Claire, Kepesh had wished to have breasts, to be a breast, and he struggles with the idea that apparently this wish was fulfilled while other more important wishes were not.

Further reading 
 

1972 American novels
Novels by Philip Roth
Fiction about shapeshifting